South 9th Street may refer to:

 South 9th Street / Theater District (Link station), a Link Light Rail station
 South 9th Street Curb Market, an American food market

See also

 Ninth Street (disambiguation)